Court of Industrial Relations may refer to:

Court of Industrial Relations (Nebraska)
 Court of Industrial Relations (Kansas)
Court of Industrial Relations in the Philippines, associated with the National Labor Relations Commission (Philippines)